"Candidatus Acidoferrum" is a candidate genus of Acidobacteriota.

See also
 List of bacterial orders
 List of bacteria genera

References

Acidobacteriota
Bacteria genera